Bodocó is a municipality in the state of Pernambuco, Brazil. Its population in 2020, according to the Brazilian Institute of Geography and Statistics (IBGE), was an estimated 38,378 and its area is 1621.79 km². Bodocó was established in 1909 from territory of the municipality of Granito.

Its current mayor is Otávio Augusto Tavares Pedrosa Cavalcante of the Brazilian Socialist Party, elected in 2020.

Geography

 Region – Sertão of Pernambuco
 Boundaries – state of Ceará (N); Parnamirim (S); Exu and Granito (E); Ouricuri and Ipubi (W)
 Area – 1553.85 km²
 Elevation – 443 m
 Drainage basin – Brigida River
 Vegetation – Caatinga (shrubland)
 Climate – semi-arid, hot and dry, Köppen: BSh
 Annual average temperature – 25.6°C
 Distance to Recife – 642.6 km

Economy

The main economic activities in Bodocó are based in commerce and agribusiness, especially the farming of goats, cattle, sheep, horses, donkeys, pigs, and honey, and cultivation of corn and manioc.

Economic indicators

Economy by sector (as of 2013)

Health indicators

References

External links 

 Official site of the Prefeitura (mayor and city hall) (in Portuguese)
 Official site of the Câmara Municipal (city council) (in Portuguese)

Municipalities in Pernambuco